Ruth Anneliese Welcome (April 24, 1919 – March 6, 2005) was a German-born American zither player.  During her 30-year career (1945-1975) she distinguished herself as America's only professional zitherist, and, as a recording artist for Capitol Records, producing 18 albums and several singles.

Background and Career 
Welcome learned to play zither as a child, and was familiar with the instrument at age 8, when
in 1927, her family emigrated to the United States and settled in New York City.  There she took lessons on piano and zither, and upon graduation from high school she was accepted at the Juilliard School of Music, where she studied piano and violin; she later taught piano at the School for several years.
 
During the second world war she joined the USO and entertained troops overseas, finding the zither more portable than the piano, and  more suitable for solo work than the violin.  After the war she continued to volunteer in military hospitals for several years.

In 1949 Anton Karas' theme music for the British film noir The Third Man had a vogue in the United States, and reintroduced the sound of the zither to an American public which hadn't paid it much notice since the turn of the previous century.  The popularity of Karas' zither-based score helped set the stage for Welcome's professional debut as a zitherist, in 1953.  Her performance, in Manhattan's famous Hampshire House, was well-received, and she became a regular attraction there for the next five years.

At the end of her run at the Hampshire House, Welcome took her zither on the road, touring the US and Canada with such success, that Capitol Records signed her to an exclusive recording contract that same year (1957).  She recorded eighteen zither albums for Capitol, which became popular all over the world, and started something of a "zither revival" in North America.  A number of manufacturers began producing concert zithers again in such numbers that today (2016) if you buy a used zither it is most likely to come either from the period 1895-1910, or from 1955-1965.

Her first album, Hi-Fi-Zither, was released in 1958, and over the next fifteen years she recorded seventeen zither albums for Capitol, as well as a number of singles.  Her repertory consisted primarily of standards and showtunes, in a style that came to be known as "mood music" or "easy listening" in the mid-1960s.

Welcome retired from touring and recording in 1975, and relocated from Connecticut to Sun City, Arizona, where she spent most of the remainder of her life.  She died in Peoria, Arizona, on March 6, 2005, and is buried in Sunland Memorial Park.

During her career, Welcome recorded more zither albums than any other zither player.  While the zither has again waned in popularity since the 1960s, Welcome's albums continue to sell briskly as collector's items, and several have been re-released on CD.  In 2013 the Guardian released an article noting the continued popularity of her music on online sharing services such as Spotify.

Discography 
Albums

Singles & EPs

References

1919 births
2005 deaths
Zither players
German emigrants to the United States